Leonidas de Toledo Marcondes de Montezuma (16 April 1869 – 18 March 1937) was an English cricketer and allround sportsman who also competed as a cyclist.

Life
De Montezuma was born at Crowborough, Sussex, the sixth of nine children. His parents were born in England, although his father was at one stage a lieutenant in the Brazilian navy. 

He was a boarder at the Royal Naval School in London. He went into business with a brother-in-law, but the business was dissolved in 1892. At around the time of his father’s death in 1895 he became a patient at the Bethlem Hospital, Beckenham, probably suffering from bipolar disorder.

He had a variety of occupations, and never married. At the time of his death in 1937 he was a patient at the City of London Mental Hospital in Stone, Kent.

Cricket career
De Montezuma was a right-handed batsman whose bowling style is unknown. He was a prominent batsman in the 1890s for the Norwood club in Surrey. He made his first-class debut for Sussex against Essex in the 1898 County Championship at the County Ground, Leyton. He made seven further first-class appearances for Sussex in that season, the last of which came against Lancashire at Old Trafford. In his eight first-class matches for Sussex, he scored 271 runs at an average of 27.10, with a high score of 80 not out. 

He later played a single first-class match for London County in 1904 against Warwickshire at Crystal Palace Park. In Warwickshire's first-innings of 326, De Montezuma took four wickets, finishing with figures of 4/71, which were the best bowling figures in that innings. He scored 14 runs in London County's first-innings response of 249, before being dismissed by James Byrne. He wasn't called upon to bat or bowl again in the match, which ended in a draw.

References

External links
Leonidas de Montezuma at ESPNcricinfo
Leonidas de Montezuma at CricketArchive

1869 births
1937 deaths
People from Crowborough
People educated at the Royal Naval School
English cricketers
Sussex cricketers
London County cricketers